Minna is a city in Middle Belt Nigeria. It is the capital city of Niger State, one of Nigeria's 36 federal states. It consists of two major ethnic groups: the Gbagyi and the Nupe.

History 
Archaeological evidence suggests settlement in the area dates back to about 47,000–37,000 years ago. Muslim culture filtered into Minna by way of the ancient Saharan trade routes much later, and the city contains many mosques including Minna Central Mosque and Muslim organizations like the Islamic Education Trust, Minna, Muslim Students' Society of Nigeria - Minna Area Council (MSSN-MNAC), Da'watu-Ilallahi-Wa-Rasulihi Association (DAWRA), etc. Sharia law is practiced. Christianity is the second major population in  Niger State, and institutions include a Faith Church, a Grace Baptist Church, Nupe Kalvari Churches, Anglican Churches, ECWA Churches, Baptist Churches, Victory Christian Church, the Apostolic Church and many others.

Minna is the home state of Nigeria's former military President Gen. Ibrahim B. Babangida, and of former Head of State Gen. Abdulsalami Abubakar. Dr. Mu'azu Babangida Aliyu was the former governor of Niger State, serving the maximum term of eight years (2007–2015).

Abubakar Sani Bello is the present governor of Niger state who took over from the opposition party ruling candidate of the Peoples Democratic Party candidate Mu'azu Babangida Aliyu, serving his second term in office.

Climate
Minna has a typical Middle Belt tropical savanna climate (Köppen Aw) with two seasons: an arid, dusty, harmattan-dominate dry season from November to April and a humid, oppressive wet season dominated by monsoonal air masses from May to October. Temperatures are hot to sweltering year round, except at the height of the wet season when air temperatures are merely very warm but the high humidity makes it equally or more uncomfortable than the hotter dry season.

Economy

Cotton, guinea corn (sorghum), Maize and ginger are the main agricultural products of the city. Yam is also extensively cultivated throughout the city. The economy also supports cattle trading, brewing, shea nut processing and gold mining. There are also FMCGs such as PZ Cussons that deal in toilet soaps, baby products, medicaments and so on.

Traditional industries and crafts in Minna include leather work and metalworking.

Transport 

Minna is connected to neighbouring cities by road. Abuja, the capital of the country, is only 150 km away. Minna is also connected by railroad to both Kano in the north and Ibadan and Lagos in the south. The city is served by Minna Airport.

Education and Health
Minna has many educational institutions, including: Fati Lami Abubakar Institute for Legal and Administrative Studies, The Federal University of Technology Minna, Niger state school of health, Niger state school of nursing and Midwifery, Niger state university of Education among others. With many high schools as Father O'Connell Science College, Minna, D.S.S Limawa, Kowa Schools, El-Bethel Academy, Jocis Schools, Hilltop Model School, Mypa schools, Himma international school, Police secondary school, El-Amin International School, FOMWAN Schools, New Horizon College, Divine Excellence International Schools and Brighter International Schools, among many others. The above-mentioned schools are the pioneering high schools in Minna. Minna has many primary health clinics with the General Hospital, Minna serving as the general health care.

Universities 

 Federal University of Technology Minna
 Niger State College of Education
 School of Nursing and Midwifery
 New Gate Science and Technology
 Niger State Polytechnic
 The Federal Polytechnic Bida

Climate

Gallery

See also 

 Railway stations in Nigeria
 Minna Airport

References 

State capitals in Nigeria
Populated places in Niger State